is a Japanese manga series written and illustrated by Yoshinori Natsume. The story follows orphan Tobei, who was beheaded  for committing countless crimes in the Edo period and sent to Hell where he suffered for 300 years. The regent of Hell makes Tobei an offer to slay 108 "Togas" (spiritual manifestations of sin) in 108 days in 21st-century Japan  with Togari, a magical sword. Tobei readily agrees for the chance to be free from Hell.

The manga was serialized in Shogakukan's Weekly Shōnen Sunday from August 2000 to February 2002, ending the series prematurely at 68 chapters. The individual chapters were collected in eight tankōbon volumes, with no solid ending. The abrupt ending was intentional as the last four pages of the 8th volume has a spoof advertisement for "Togari: The Perfect Edition". Then the publishers apologized for the spoof in the last page of the volume. The manga was licensed for English release in North America by Viz Media. A sequel, titled Togari Shiro, was serialized in Media Factory's Monthly Comic Flapper from October 2009 to May 2011.

Plot
The plot centers around an orphan known as Tobei who lived in Japan 300 years ago and committed countless violent crimes until the age of 16, when he was beheaded by villagers and subsequently sent to Hell as punishment. During his supposedly eternal punishment, Tobei made repeated escape attempts and became known for a particularly fiery spirit, everlasting determination, and a continuing refusal to repent for his sins.

Given Tobei's dismal moral progress over the course of 300 years, he was made an offer to escape: take the Togari, (a magical bokken with strength proportional to the user's evil spirit) and slay 108 "Toga", spiritual manifestations of great sin that drive a human's actions, in 108 days. Ose, the demon responsible for torturing Tobei in Hell, was told to watch over Tobei while Tobei accomplished his mission.

However, Tobei was subject to two particular rules so as to facilitate his moral reshaping: Firstly, he cannot commit any sins or crimes; even if he begins thinking about committing a sin, the wounds from his decapitation 300 years ago will begin opening. If he actually completes a sin, he will be decapitated and sent back to Hell. Secondly, he cannot physically harm people. If he does, then the same damage is done to himself.

Impeding Tobei's mission, however, is a property of the sword Togari: if Tobei loses control of it, then Togari will absorb him (so that he suffers eternally within Togari, along with all other souls of people who have failed this mission in the past). Furthermore, unlike in Hell, when all his physical wounds healed almost instantly, Tobei's body is mortal on Earth.

Under the supervision of Ose, who often takes the form of a dog while watching over Tobei, Tobei attempts to slay 108 Toga in the real world, and lives a different life than he did 300 years ago in part because of the people he meets and the restrictions against sinning placed on his body.

Characters

Tobei lived as a young child during the Edo period of Japan. He did not have any parents and lived on the streets and barely survived as a child. After killing a nobleman, he took away his identity document proving that he is Tobei Kihara, but his real name is unknown. Everyone who came to meet him told him over and over again that he should "just die" and "go to hell". He was often abused and tortured by the townsfolk. As he grew up he learned he had to steal things, including lives, or he would not survive. Eventually, he ended up going into murderous rages and killed everyone who was in his way. He was soon caught after killing so many people and was beheaded at sixteen. Since his death, Tobei had been living in Hell for 300 years, tortured by Ose so he can "repent for his sins". Tobei has tried to escape Hell numerous times, but was always caught by Ose. One day, however, Lady Ema offers him a deal where if he collected 108 sins in 108 days he'd be free to return to Earth. He hastily takes the opportunity without thinking of the consequences.

Itsuki is a young high school girl whose cop father was murdered when she was still a child. She hates that her father's killer is still at large and probably living in peace. She became a tomboy after her father's death. Itsuki has a strong sense of justice and is the first to get a reaction from Tobei, other than bloodlust, just by thanking him for saving her (even if unintentionally) after she was nearly raped and murdered by a thug.

Ose has been Tobei's handler for 100 years and was originally an angel. He was ordered by Lady Ema to follow Tobei in the human world as a dog to make sure he did not disrupt the order of the natural world. He is often mistaken by other people as Tobei's pet.

Lady Ema is the regent of Hell. She offered Tobei his freedom if he could collect 108 sins in 108 days using the Togari. She oversees Tobei and Ose in the present time as a young business woman.

Detective Sawazaki is a University of Tokyo graduate. He is an over-qualified police detective who's passed the first-class civil servant exam. He is highly suspicious of Tobei and follows the Toga-removed victims of Tobei closely. He comments that all the victims have suffered from "psychological trauma" when arrested. He was also the junior partner of Itsuki's father ten years before the start of the story.

Development
Inspired by Japanese samurai films and with a concept that the protagonist is a "pure bad guy", author Natsume drew Tobei based on "someone who looked like he [would] be beheaded as a criminal". Lady Ema was first drawn by Natsume with an image of Enma Daio in mind but "she ended up turning into a sexy bombshell". Togari was cancelled in its serialisation run in Weekly Shōnen Sunday by the magazine.<ref name="ANN">{{cite web|url=http://www.animenewsnetwork.com/news/2009-10-15/batman/death-mask-natsume-starts-togari-sequel|title=Batman: Death Mask'''s Natsume Starts Togari Sequel (Updated)|date=2009-10-15|publisher=Anime News Network|access-date=9 December 2009}}</ref>

ReleaseTogari is written and illustrated by Yoshinori Natsume. The manga was serialized in Shogakukan's Weekly Shōnen Sunday from August 16, 2000, to February 27, 2002, ending the series prematurely at 68 chapters. ending the series prematurely at 68 chapters. Shogakukan collected its chapters in eight tankōbon volumes, released from January 18, 2001, and March 18, 2002. The abrupt ending was intentional by the publishers, as the last four pages of the 8th volume has a spoof advertisement for "Togari: The Perfect Edition". Then the publishers apologized for the spoof in the last page of the volume. Media Factory republished the series in a four-volume edition, released from October 23 to November 22, 2010.

Viz Media released the manga in North America, with English translation by AltJapan Co., Ltd. The eight volumes were released between July 10, 2007, and September 9, 2008. Delcourt licensed the manga in France, and released the eight volumes between August 1, 2002, and December 5, 2003.

Natsume wrote a sequel, titled , serialized in Media Factory's Monthly Comic Flapper from October 5, 2009, to May 2, 2011. Media Factory collected its chapters in three tankōbon volumes, released from May 22, 2010, to June 23, 2011.

Reception
Natsume's art was commended for featuring "heavy inks, lots of crosshatching, and copious amounts of shading". Mania.com's Patricia Beard feels that the manga makes a "compelling read" by "laying out its premise and conditions by the mid-point of the first volume". Manga Life's Michael Aronson comments that the manga simply rearranges the "premise of every other pop manga series. We have an anachronistic protagonist (InuYasha) who’s rather impure at heart (Death Note) hunting spirits that no one else can see (Bleach)". Ed Sizemore from Comics Worth Reading criticises the series for ending its unfinished story with volume 8. As well as "putting salt in the wound" by advertising for "Togari: The Perfect Edition" in the last four pages, with the last sentence of the ad reading: "Sorry, this was all a joke! Thank you all for reading." Jason Thompson's online appendix to Manga: The Complete Guide compares Togari to Inuyasha in their shared theme of "a villain gradually [turning] into a good guy" commenting that "Togari'' makes a stronger than usual effort to show Tobe’s gradual socialization process." Thompson also comments on the art "while not nearly as scary as the premise suggests, is clean and chiseled, similar to Ryōji Minagawa." In a series of reviews on Manga News, the manga's graphics is commended for its "pure style with panels that are not overdone", commendation on the level of precision through explanation, with discrete action and advancing the plot through the use of intrigue.

References

External links
Togari at Delcourt website 

2000 manga
Action anime and manga
Dark fantasy anime and manga
Kadokawa Dwango franchises
Media Factory manga
Shogakukan manga
Shōnen manga
Viz Media manga